The National Alliance  was an electoral alliance in Egypt that was established by former Egyptian prime minister Kamal Ganzouri; Ganzouri decided not to compete in the 2015 Egyptian parliamentary election. The spokesman for the Egyptian Front criticized the alliance for its inclusion of "Mubarak-era government ministers". The Egyptian Wafd Coalition declined an offer to join the alliance. The Arabic Popular Movement would have joined the alliance. Some of the individuals involved with the list included Mahmoud Badr and Mounir Fakhry Abdel Nour (though Badr joined the For the Love of Egypt alliance).

Formerly affiliated parties and coalitions
 Egyptian Front
 Modern Egypt Party
 My Homeland Egypt Party
 Egyptian Patriotic Movement
 Democratic Generation Party
 Independent Current Coalition
  Democratic Peace Party
 Egyptian Arab Socialist Party
 Revolutionary Forces Bloc
 Free Egyptians Party

References

Defunct political party alliances in Egypt